Oberth is a surname. Notable people with the surname include:

 Hermann Oberth (1894–1989), Austro-Hungarian-born Romanian physicist and engineer
 Hermann-Oberth-Gesellschaft
 Oberth (crater)
 Hermann Oberth Space Travel Museum
 Oberth effect (astrodynamics)
 Erna Roth Oberth (1923–2012), Transylvanian-German lawyer
 Christian Oberth (1953?–2012), video game programmer

See also 
 Obert, Nebraska
 Oberthal (disambiguation)